Kaz Oshiro (born 1967, Okinawa, Japan) is an artist based in Los Angeles. His work resides between painting and sculpture: he makes uncannily realistic objects—a full-size replica of a garbage dumpster or a column of wood-paneled Sony bookshelf speakers—but using stretcher bars, canvas, and paint. 

Oshiro emigrated to the United States in 1986. He studied at California State University, Los Angeles, graduating with a BA and an MFA.

He had two solo exhibitions at the Yvon Lambert Gallery in New York. His work has been exhibited at museums and galleries including Apex Art, the Swiss Institute and the Asia Society and Museum in New York, the Cincinnati Contemporary Arts Center, the Orange County Museum of Art, UCLA Hammer Museum in Los Angeles, the Royal Academy in London, and Veletrzni Palace in Prague. His work appears in Lifelike, a group show at the Walker Art Center, the New Orleans Museum of Art, the Museum of Contemporary Art, San Diego, and the Blanton Museum of Art.

Oshiro is represented by Rosamund Felsen Gallery in Santa Monica, California and in Paris by  Galerie Frank Elbaz.

References

External links
Kaz Oshiro - Saatchi Gallery

1967 births
Living people
California State University, Los Angeles alumni